Étienne Bouhot (8 August 1780 – 17 July 1862) was a French painter and art teacher.

Bouhot was born in Bard-lès-Époisses.  He was the director of the École de Dessin (School of Drawing) in Semur-en-Auxois.  He died in Semur-en-Auxois.

Gallery

References

External links
Galleries
French painting 1774-1830: the Age of Revolution, fully digitized text from The Metropolitan Museum of Art libraries

1780 births
1862 deaths
19th-century French painters
French male painters
19th-century French male artists
18th-century French male artists